Stargardzki Park Przemysłowy - an industrial park in Stargard, a district town in north-west Poland (West Pomeranian Voivodeship). The total area is about 150 ha. In the area: ship (Police Harbour (Police) and Szczecin-Świnoujście Harbour (Szczecin and Świnoujście)), road and rail transport, Szczecin-Goleniów "Solidarność" Airport (Goleniów) and a centre of Stargard.

External links
 Stargardzka Agencja Rozwoju Lokalnego Sp. z o. o.

Buildings and structures in West Pomeranian Voivodeship
Industrial parks in Poland
Stargard County